Edgar S. Coolidge (October 11, 1855 – February 20, 1923) was a member of the Vermont House of Representatives.

Biography
Coolidge was born on October 11, 1855 in Wyocena, Wisconsin. His parents were Edward B. Coolidge and Rosetta (Works) Coolidge. He was a Congregationalist and a Mason. He was a farmer in Lowell, Vermont and served in local government including constable and lister. He died in Lowell, Vermont, on February 20, 1923.

Career
Coolidge was a member of the House of Representatives in 1888. He was a Republican.

References

1855 births
1923 deaths
People from Orleans County, Vermont
People from Wyocena, Wisconsin
Republican Party members of the Vermont House of Representatives